Yi Yu-won (1814–1888) was a scholar-official of the late Joseon period. He served as Chief State Councilor (1873-1875) under King Gojong. He excelled in both painting and calligraphy.

Family 
Parents
Father: Yi Gyejo (이계조)(29 April 1792 – 11 October 1805), Minister of Personnel (이조판서)
Grandfather: Yi Seok-gyu (이석규)(3 November 1758 – 29 March  1837), Minister of Personnel (이조판서)
Grandmother: Lady Jo, of the Yangju Jo clan (양주조씨)(4 January 1760 – 11 July 1805), daughter of Jo Taehyeon (조태현)
Mother: Lady Park, of the Bannam Park clan (반남박씨;b.1754), daughter of Park Jongshin (박종신)
Wives and issues:
Lady Jeong, of the Dongrae Jeong clan (동래 정씨) (1795년 – 1879), daughter of Jeong Heon-yong (정헌용)
Yi Seok-yeong (이석영) (1855 – 1934), Vice-Minister (참판), adopted son — biological son of Yi Yu-seung (이유승)
Daughter-in-law: Daughter of Jeong Gi-cheol (정기철)
Daughter-in-law: Lady Park, of the Bannam Park (반남박씨), daughter of Park Injin (박인진)
Yi Su-yeong (이수영,d.1880), Secretary (참의), first son
Lady Yi, of the Gyeongju Yi clan (경주이씨), first daughter
Son-in-law: Jo Yeonbin (조연빈) (1832 – 1859)
Lady Yi, of the Gyeongju Yi clan (경주이씨), second daughter
Son-in-law: Jo Jeonghui (조정희), Vice-Minister (참판)
Unknown concubine
Yi Ho-yeong (이호영), a Gunsu (군수), son
Daughter-in-law: Daughter of the  Yi Jang-ryeom (이장렴)
Yi Pyo-yeong (이표영), a Uigwan (의관), son
Daughter-in-law: Daughter of Kim Se-ho (김세호)
Daughter-in-law: Dauhhter of Yi Jae-oh (이재오)
Lady Yi, of the Gyeongju Yi clan (경주이씨), third daughter

Gallery

References

Brief biography and gallery (in Korean)

1814 births
1888 deaths
19th-century Korean painters

ko:이유원 (1763년)